Akvilė Stapušaitytė (born 25 March 1986) is a Lithuanian badminton player. She was born in Tauragė, Lithuanian SSR.

Career 
Stapušaitytė won the Lithuanian National Badminton Championships in 2006–2014. Lithuania Open title winner. She attended the 2008 Summer Olympics and lost to Tine Rasmussen in the second round. She also represented Lithuania in 2012 Summer Olympics where she was eliminated after group stage.

Media 
Stapušaitytė was nominated among most charming sportswomen of 2013 in Lithuania. In 2014, she was on the cover of SportIN magazine.

Achievements

BWF International Challenge/Series 
Women's singles

Women's doubles

Mixed doubles

  BWF International Challenge tournament
  BWF International Series tournament
  BWF Future Series tournament

References

External links 
 

1986 births
Living people
People from Tauragė
Lithuanian female badminton players
Badminton players at the 2008 Summer Olympics
Badminton players at the 2012 Summer Olympics
Olympic badminton players of Lithuania
Badminton players at the 2015 European Games
European Games competitors for Lithuania